Spirolobium is a genus of flowering plants in the family Apocynaceae, first described as a genus in 1889. It includes only one known species, Spirolobium cambodianum, native to Southeast Asia (Vietnam, Laos, Cambodia, Thailand, Malaysia, Borneo).

References

Monotypic Apocynaceae genera
Flora of Indo-China
Flora of Malesia
Malouetieae
Taxa named by Henri Ernest Baillon